The Copa San Juan Gobierno is a tennis tournament held in San Juan, Argentina since 2012. The event has been part of the ATP Challenger Tour from 2012 until 2014. From 2015 on, the event is part of the ITF Men's Circuit. The tournament is played on clay courts, until 2016 at the Club Banco Hispano and from 2017 on at the San Juan Lawn Tennis Club.

Past finals

Singles

Doubles

References

External links
Official website

 
ATP Challenger Tour
Tennis tournaments in Argentina
Clay court tennis tournaments